Brielmaier is a surname. Notable people with the surname include:

Ben Brielmaier (born 1983), American football player
Bret Brielmaier (born 1985), American basketball coach
Erhard Brielmaier (1841–1917), American architect
Isolde Brielmaier (born 1971), American curator and scholar